The vice president of Sudan is the second highest political position obtainable in Sudan. Currently there is a provision for one de facto vice president, deputy chairman of the Transitional Sovereignty Council, who is appointed by the chairman of the council. Historically (in the 1972–1983 and 2005–2011 periods) either the first or the second vice president was from Southern Sudan (now independent South Sudan). From 2011 until the abolition of the post in 2019, the second vice president was from Darfur.

Vice presidents

First vice presidents

Second vice presidents

Third vice presidents

Assistants and advisors to the president

Senior assistants to the president

Assistants to the president
 Nafii Ali Nafii Ahmed
 Musa Mohamed Ahmed; from Eastern Sudan

Advisors to the president
 Shartai Jaafar Abdel Hakam (11 January 2012 – ????)

See also
 Politics of Sudan
 List of governors of pre-independence Sudan
 List of heads of state of Sudan
 List of heads of government of Sudan
 List of current vice presidents
 Lists of office-holders

Notes

References

Government of Sudan
 
Sudan
Sudan